One More Tomorrow may refer to:

 One More Tomorrow (album), an album by Henry Gross
 One More Tomorrow (film), a 1946 American film